Alexandre Vuillemin (1812-1880) was a prominent 19th century French cartographer and editor based in Paris. He produced a number of atlases, and his maps are noted for the frequent use of extensive margin illustrations – vignettes, famous people, and views of cities.  His atlases were popular, and many went through multiple editions.

Despite a prolific cartographic career, not a lot is known of Vuillemin's life.  He studied under the French cartographer Auguste Dufour (1798 - 1865), and his atlases and maps are held by and available through many collections including the British Museum and the University of Alabama Historical Maps of Europe Archive. Vuillemin's most important works include his detailed, highly decorative large format Atlas Illustré de Géographie Commerciale et Industrielle as well as his many French Atlases.

Selected works
 Atlas illustré de géographie commerciale et industrielle
 Atlas illustré destiné à l'enseignement de la géographie élémentaire
 Atlas universel (1839, 1847 and 1871)
 Atlas de géographie ancienne et moderne à destination des pensionnats (Paris 1843)
 Atlas national illustré de la France (1845)
 Mappemonde (Paris 1856)
 Atlas du cosmos (1867)
 Atlas topographique de la France (1873)
 Atlas de géographie contemporaine (1875)
 Carte de la Baltique donnant le Sund, le golfe de Finlande (1854)
 La France et ses Colonies: Atlas illustré cent cartes dressées d’après les cartes de Cassini, du Dépot de la guerre, des Ponts-et-chaussées et de la Marine (1858 and 1870)

External Links to Works Available Online
 La France et ses Colonies, 1858. Link to 101 maps from the atlas “France and its Colonies” at Old Book Art
 University of Alabama University of Alabama Historical Maps of Europe Archive (1836-1850). Some of his maps of Europe.

References

Notes

Bibliography
 British Museum “British Museum Catalogue of Printed Books” British Museum, 1882. London, England.
 Goffart, Walter “Historical atlases: the first three hundred years, 1570-1870” University Of Chicago Press, 2003.  Chicago IL.
 Tooley, Ronald V. "Mapping of Australia" Holland Press, 1979.

1812 births
1880 deaths
French cartographers